Glenea quinquelineata is a species of beetle in the family Cerambycidae. It was described by Chevrolat in 1855. It is known from Equatorial Guinea, Cameroon, the Democratic Republic of the Congo, the Ivory Coast, Uganda, Angola, and Nigeria.

Subspecies
 Glenea quinquelineata angolensis Breuning, 1978
 Glenea quinquelineata quinquelineata Chevrolat, 1855

References

quinquelineata
Beetles described in 1855